Vijay Stars Kondattam in London is a 2018-2018 Tamil language reality singing competition comedy event show. The show was held 18 February 2018 at 18:30 (UTC) in Eventim Apollo, London. The show premiered on Vijay TV on 18 February 2018 on Sunday at 15:00 (IST) and the show was hosted by Ma Ka Pa Anand.

Synopsis
The show is about artists of Vijay TV who  travel to London to entertain the Tamil diaspora.

Vijay Stars

References

External links
Vijay TV Official Website on Hotstar

Star Vijay original programming
2018 Tamil-language television series debuts
Tamil-language television shows
2019 Tamil-language television series endings